Eric Wong, born in New York City, is the president and CMO of recorded music for Warner Music Group.

Career

1997–present
Wong grew up obsessed with music and at age 16, went from devotedly studying the Billboard  Charts each week to an internship while still in high school. A summer internship position at WEA Distribution led to yet another internship at Atlantic Records. While attending New York University, Wong became a college rep for EMI Records. In 1997, while still at school, he was hired at V2 Records, where he was eventually promoted to product manager, overseeing campaigns for artists such as Moby, Underworld, and Stereophonics.

In 1999, Wong joined the Island Def Jam Music Group. As Vice President of Marketing, Wong developed campaigns for a diverse group of acts which included Bon Jovi, Fall Out Boy, Rihanna, Slayer, Sum 41, and Christina Milian.

In 2006, he went to work for Bad Boy Entertainment and Atlantic Records, serving simultaneously as Chief Marketing Officer of Bad Boy and Senior Vice President of Marketing at Atlantic. In this dual role, he was able to get more deeply involved in hip-hop—and study the branding and product extensions of Bad Boy's Sean “Diddy” Combs—while keeping a hand in the rock and pop he also loved.

Wong points to the opportunity to work on Jay-Z’s landmark 2009 album The Blueprint 3 as a defining moment in his career.  

Seeking additional challenges, in 2009, he founded Wong Management, where he worked closely with Mariah Carey.  

In 2011, he returned to the Island Def Jam Music Group as Executive Vice President of Marketing, executing creative marketing strategies for artists including Kanye West, Rihanna, Avicii, The-Dream, Fall Out Boy, The Killers, Toni Braxton, and Babyface. His responsibilities expanded to oversee the label group's marketing, digital, creative, artist development, video promotion, and video production departments.

In 2014, Wong assumed the role of Executive Vice President / General Manager of Island Records where he led the day-to-day operations of the company.

In 2018, Wong was named the Chief Operating Officer (COO) of Island Records, overseeing operations for the entire label. He oversaw label operations and strategy for Island's entire roster which include artists such as Shawn Mendes, Demi Lovato, Nick Jonas, Fall Out Boy, Tove Lo, The Killers, Bishop Briggs, Jessie Reyez, Elton John, and Mike Posner.

In 2020, Wong became President & Chief Marketing Officer (CMO) of Recorded Music for Warner Music Group, which is home to artists including Ed Sheeran, Cardi B, Coldplay, Dua Lipa, Bruno Mars, Roddy Ricch.

Philanthropy
Wong, a previous board of directors member for the Asian American Arts Alliance, was honored by the foundation in 2007. The organization is dedicated to strengthening Asian American artists and cultural groups through resource sharing, promotion, and community building.

Selected honors and distinctions
Billboard International Power Player List (2022, 2021) and 2022.
Billboard  Executive of the Week (2022) 
Billboard Power 100 list (2019, 2020, 2021, 2022)
Gold House's A100 List of Most Impactful Asians (2020, 2021, 2022)
Variety New Power of New York List (2018)<ref>{{cite web |title=The New Power of New York List 2018 |url=https://variety.com/gallery/2018-new-power-of-new-york-list/#!43/eric-wong-headshot2018-2_re |website=Variety |access-date=7 November 2018 |date=2 October 2018}}</ref>Billboard'' Forty Under Forty Power Players List (2012, 2015)

References

Living people
New York University alumni
American music industry executives
Year of birth missing (living people)